Batley railway station serves the large town of Batley in West Yorkshire, England.

The station is now managed by Northern Trains, who operate the service from Leeds to Wigan Wallgate via Manchester Victoria. Services via Huddersfield are currently provided by TransPennine Express.

Facilities
Batley railway station is unstaffed, though the main buildings on the eastbound platform (1) still stand and are used as a waiting area and entrance; a self-service ticket machine is also located there. Car parking is also available for visitors to access directly outside the train staion entrance. 
There is a shelter on Platform 2 and both have digital display screens and timetable posters for train running information provision.  Only Platform 1 has step-free access, as the subway to Platform 2 has stairways.

Services
The service here, which changed substantially in May 2018, was altered again at the December 2018 timetable change after issues with punctuality and service reliability.  The net effect has been to essentially restore the pattern that formerly served the station prior to the May 2018 changes, which was one Leeds to Huddersfield stopping train per hour each way (now operated by TransPennine Express and calling at all local stations) and one Northern Trains service between Leeds, Manchester Victoria and  via Brighouse. The former Southport trains now terminate at Wigan.

On Sundays, there is an hourly service to Leeds and Huddersfield.

History
The station was at one time rather larger than it is today, as it was also served by the Great Northern Railway branch line from Bradford to Wakefield via Dewsbury Central from December 1864 to 7 September 1964, when it fell victim to the Beeching Axe. It was also the junction for branch lines to Birstall (opened in 1852, closed to passengers as a wartime economy measure in 1917 and to all traffic in 1963) and to Tingley and Beeston (opened in 1890, closed in 1951).  The station was significantly enlarged (with the addition of three extra platforms) on the opening of the latter route in August 1890, but reverted to the present twin-platform configuration after the closure and abandonment of the Bradford - Wakefield line in 1964/5.Few traces of any of these routes remain today, but the abutments of the former bridge that took the Bradford line across the line from Leeds near Batley signal box (east of the station) can still be seen. 

In June 2018, a protest was held by Batley and Spen MP Tracy Brabin following weeks of disruption to its services after  Northern announced the roll out of a new timetable. The Labour MP argued people who live in the north of the country are fed up of being at the bottom of the pile when it comes to transport investment.

In 2023, Network Rail announced plans to replace the Lady Anne level crossing with a footbridge, and to demolish the signal box, as part of a programme of work to upgrade the TransPennine Line.

Notes

Gallery

External links

Railway stations in Kirklees
DfT Category F1 stations
Former London and North Western Railway stations
Railway stations in Great Britain opened in 1848
Northern franchise railway stations
Batley
Railway stations served by TransPennine Express